Sathaporn Daengsee (born 13 May 1988) is a Thai professional footballer who plays as a left back for Thai League 1 club Nongbua Pitchaya and the Thailand national team.

International career
On 12 April 2021, He was named in manager Akira Nishino’s 47-man squad for Thailand’s 2022 World Cup qualification.

Honours

Clubs
Buriram United
 Kor Royal Cup: 2016

External links
 

1988 births
Living people
Sathaporn Daengsee
Sathaporn Daengsee
Association football fullbacks
Sathaporn Daengsee
Sathaporn Daengsee
Sathaporn Daengsee
Sathaporn Daengsee
Sathaporn Daengsee